The Birmingham Sabers were a team of the Continental Basketball League based in  Birmingham, Alabama that began play in 2010

The team was born when the Birmingham Steel moved to the WBA. The CBL commissioner, Dennis Truax, announced that Paul Smith would take over as owner of the Birmingham franchise.  Several Steel players stayed with the Sabers, who also retained the team records and statistics of the Steel.

Season-by-season record

References

External links
 Birmingham Sabers official website

Continental Basketball League teams
Sports teams in Birmingham, Alabama
Basketball teams in Alabama
Basketball teams established in 2010
2010 establishments in Alabama
Sports clubs disestablished in 2011
2011 disestablishments in Alabama